Joseph Yorke may refer to:

Joseph Yorke, 1st Baron Dover (1724–1792), British soldier, politician and diplomat
Joseph Sydney Yorke (1768–1831), British naval commander, nephew of the above
Joseph Yorke (MP) (1807–1889), British landowner and politician, kinsman of the above
Joseph Yorke, 10th Earl of Hardwicke (born 1971), British peer